"No Fear" is a song by the Finnish alternative rock band The Rasmus, originally released on the band's sixth studio album Hide from the Sun on September 2, 2005. The single was the first (and most successful) to be released from the album.

Following its release on August 29, 2005, the single achieved some chart success across Europe, as well as topping the Israeli singles chart. The music video also reached No. 1 on MTV Europe's Nordic chart list "UpNorth".

Single track listing
 CD single - International
 "No Fear"
 "No Fear" (Fearless Remix)
 CD maxi single
 "No Fear"
 "Immortal"
 "No Fear" (Vrenna Remix)
 CD single - UK
 "No Fear"
 "No Fear" (Freelance Hellraiser Remix)
 EP - UK
 "No Fear" – 4:07
 "Immortal" – 4:57
 "Dancer in the Dark" – 3:28
 "No Fear" (Vrenna Remix) – 3:40
 "The Rasmus Software Player:
 No Fear (Video) - 3:57
 No Fear (Making Of) - 8:02
 Photo Gallery
 Extra video material
 Web Links

Music video
The music video for "No Fear" was directed by Jörn Heitmann in Berlin, Germany the same year. Jörn Heitmann has also directed many of Rammstein's videos.

 The video depicts a girl with an apparent obsession with butterflies. She follows them out of her bedroom and sleepwalks across roofs, and through streets. The girl eventually comes to a roof of glass panes and falls through them into the building. It is unclear whether the girl has died or not, and she appears to end up in a garden with a bed situated in the middle, surrounded by butterflies and flowers. While she is sleepwalking, a swarm of butterflies become animated from pictures behind where the band are performing, and other places around the building.

Charts

References

External links
 The Rasmus' official website
 "No Fear" lyrics
 "No Fear" music video on YouTube

2005 singles
The Rasmus songs
Number-one singles in Finland
Songs written by Lauri Ylönen
2005 songs